In mathematics, Hurwitz determinants were introduced by   , who used them to give a criterion for all roots of a polynomial to have negative real part.

Definition

Consider a characteristic polynomial P in the variable λ of the form:

The square Hurwitz matrix associated to P is given below:

The i-th Hurwitz determinant is the i-th leading principal minor (minor is a determinant) of the above Hurwitz matrix H. There are n Hurwitz determinants for a characteristic polynomial of degree n.

See also
 Transfer matrix

References

Linear algebra
Determinants

de:Hurwitzpolynom#Hurwitz-Kriterium